The 2018 Aragon motorcycle Grand Prix was the fourteenth round of the 2018 MotoGP season. It was held at the Ciudad del Motor de Aragón in Alcañiz on 23 September 2018.

Classification

MotoGP

 Pol Espargaró suffered a broken left collarbone in a crash during practice and withdrew from the event.

Moto2

 Isaac Viñales withdrew from the event due to a hand injury suffered during the previous round at Misano.

Moto3

Championship standings after the race

MotoGP

Moto2

Moto3

Notes

References

Aragon
Aragon Motorcycle Grand Prix
Aragon motorcycle Grand Prix
Aragon motorcycle Grand Prix